Victor Kan (簡華捷, Kan Wah-chit; born 1941) is a student of the late  Ip Man and began his Wing Chun instruction at the age of 13 years in Hong Kong. He was with Yip Man for 7 years and in that time during which he became known as the 'King of Chi Sao' or 'The Untouchable'. By the late 1950s he assisted Yip Man until he left for Europe in 1961. He teaches in the UK and has been doing so since 1975.  He also has branches in Italy, Australia and Hong Kong.

Bruce Lee
Is reputed to have taught Bruce Lee the first section of the Siu Nim Tao form.

References 

1941 births
Wing Chun practitioners from Hong Kong
Living people